The Sir Arthur Clarke Award is a British award given annually since 2005 in recognition of notable contributions to space exploration, particularly British achievements. Nominations for the awards are made by members of the public, with shortlists drawn up by a panel of judges, who also choose the winner. Sir Arthur C. Clarke chose a special award independently of the public nominations.

History

Founded in 2005, the idea for the awards was proposed by Dave Wright to Jerry Stone, who then suggested they be named after Sir Arthur Clarke. Once permission was granted, Jerry Stone decided what the awards should look like, what categories should be included, and how they should be nominated and judged. The awards are presented by the Arthur C. Clarke Foundation, although the selection is delegated to the British Interplanetary Society, with the exception of the International award, whose recipient is voted on by the Foundation 

Having obtained Sir Arthur's permission for the awards to bear his name, Jerry Stone decided that the awards should have the same proportions (1:4:9) as the monolith featured in Clarke's 2001: A Space Odyssey, and be made of glass, as the description on the book of 2001 describes 'a crystalline monolith'.  This represents Clarke's science fiction work. The award features the diagram Clarke drew in 1945 in order to demonstrate how satellites can provide global communications around the Earth from geostationary orbit, also called the Clarke Orbit. This represents Clarke's science work. It was co-designed by Howard Berry, who suggested the font and lettering style.

Initially the awards were presented at the UK Space Conference (the British Rocketry Oral History Programme until it was renamed in 2008) which was held annually at Charterhouse School, Surrey, from 1998 to 2010. The association with the conference continues but only in alternate years, as the conference has been bi-annual since 2011.

Not all categories are awarded each year; for example, 2008 was the first year in which nominations were shortlisted in the category of Best Film Presentation. An additional award was given in 2007 and 2008 that was named after and presented by George Abbey, the former director of the Johnson Space Center. It was awarded to those "whose space achievement made us laugh the most".

The award ceremony is similar to the Oscars in that multiple awards are given in various categories at the same event, which is different from other awards given in the field. As a result, the awards have been referred to as the Arthurs.  The awards are held in high regard by the international Space community:

2020
The 2020 awards were presented at the Reinventing Space Conference Gala Dinner on Tuesday 29 June 2021, which was delayed from 2020 due to the COVID-19 pandemic.

2019
The 2019 awards were presented at the Reinventing Space Conference Gala Dinner on Thursday 14 November

2018
The 2018 awards were presented at a gala dinner at the 2018 Reinventing Space Conference at The Royal Aeronautical Society on Thursday 1 November 2018. The finalists were announced on the BIS website on 7 October.

2017

The 2017 awards were presented at a gala dinner at the 2017 UK Space Conference, held at Manchester Central on Wednesday 31 May 2017.

2016

The 2016 awards were presented at a gala dinner at the 2016 Reinventing Space Conference at The Royal Society on Thursday 27 October 2016. The event was sponsored by the UK Space Agency.

2015

The 2015 awards were presented at the UK Space Conference Dinner in St George's Hall, Liverpool on Tuesday 14 July 2015. They were sponsored by the UK Space Agency.

2014

The Sir Arthur Clarke Awards 2014 were presented at an event at The Royal Aeronautical Society on Wednesday 8 October 2014, by the Chief Executive of the UK Space Agency, Dr David Parker.

The specific ESA/Industry Rosetta team members who received the "Space Achievement - Industry/Project Team" award:
Dr. Andrea Accomazzo, Rosetta Flight Director, ESOC, Darmstadt
Dr. Paolo Ferri, Head of Mission Operations, ESOC,  Darmstadt
Dr. Rainer Best, Rosetta Project Manager, Airbus DS, Friedrichshafen
Hans-Martin Hell, Rosetta Platform Manager, Airbus DS, Friedrichshafen
Rod Emery, Rosetta UK Platform Project Manager, Airbus DS, Stevenage
Phil McGoldrick, Rosetta UK Platform Engineering Manager, Airbus DS, Stevenage
Penny Irvine, Rosetta UK Platform System Engineer, Airbus DS, Stevenage
Dr. Stephan Ulamec, Philae Project Manager, DLR

2013

The 2013 awards were presented at the UK Space Conference at the Glasgow Science Centre, at a black tie dinner on 16 July hosted by Helen Keen. Tim Peake, the UK's ESA astronaut presented the awards to the recipients.

2012

As the UK Space Agency are only planning to run the space conference in alternate years, the 2012 awards were presented at a special event in the Cholmondeley Room at the House of Lords on 26 October 2012. The host was Lord Cobbold and the MC for the event was the impressionist Jon Culshaw.

2011
The 2011 award took place at the UK Space Conference at the University of Warwick in July 2011.

2010
The award dinner was held on 27 March 2010 at the UK Space Conference at Charterhouse.

2009
The 2009 Awards dinner was held on 4 April 2009 at the UK Space conference.

2008

The 2008 Awards dinner was held on 29 March 2008 at Charterhouse. Special guests were George Abbey and Joe Engle.

2007

The 2007 Awards dinner was held on 14 April 2007 at the BROHP conference at Charterhouse.

Among the other nominees were Anousheh Ansari, and the British-born astronaut Piers Sellers.

2006
The 2006 Awards dinner was held on 8 April 2006 at the BROHP conference at Charterhouse.

Among the other nominees were Sir Richard Branson, and the Robson Green drama television series Rocket Man.

2005
Presented at the inaugural awards dinner at Charterhouse, Saturday 2 April 2005.

Sir Arthur was also presented with a special award commemorating the 60th anniversary of his paper on global communication by satellite in the October 1945 edition of Wireless World.  This award was accepted on behalf of Sir Arthur by his brother Fred.

See also
 List of space technology awards

References

External links
Sir Arthur Clarke Awards, 2005-2012, British Interplanetary Society, 5 April 2013.
British Rocketry Oral History Programme
Official site
UK Space Conference, host event for the awards, for 2011.
UK Space Conference, host event for the awards, years up to and including 2010.
Photographs from the 2006 Arthurs and BROHP conference
2005 Awards review

Arthur C. Clarke
Clarke
Awards established in 2005
2005 establishments in the United Kingdom
British science and technology awards
Space programme of the United Kingdom